The name Dan has been used to name five tropical cyclones in the Northwestern Pacific Ocean.

Typhoon Dan (1989) (T8928, 29W, Saling)
Typhoon Dan (1992) (T9226, 27W)
Tropical Storm Dan (1995) (T9524, 35W, Trining)
Typhoon Dan (1996) (T9604, 06W)
Typhoon Dan (1999) (T9925, 26W, Pepang)

See also
Hurricane Danny

Pacific typhoon set index articles